Izvoare may refer to the following places:
 Moldova
Izvoare, Fălești, a commune
Izvoare, Florești, a commune
 , a village in Pohrebeni Commune
Izvoare, Sîngerei, a commune
 Romania
Izvoare, a village in Bahna commune, Neamț County
Izvoare, Dolj, a commune
Izvoare, a village in Dumbrava Roșie commune, Neamț County
Izvoare, a village in Suharău commune, Botoșani County
Izvoare, a village in Zetea commune, Harghita County
Izvoare, a tributary of the Neamț in Neamț County
Izvoare, another name for the river Pârâul Băutor, Harghita County